Rutshuru Airport  is an airport serving the town of Rutshuru in Democratic Republic of the Congo.

See also

List of airports in the Democratic Republic of the Congo
Transport in the Democratic Republic of the Congo

References

External links
 OurAirports - Rutshuru
 FallingRain - Rutshuru
 OpenStreetMap - Rutshuru

Airports in North Kivu